The Designated Mourner is a play written by Wallace Shawn in 1996, which was adapted into a film directed by David Hare in 1997.

The film, which follows the play's script closely, is based on the original London stage production directed by Hare and has the same cast: Mike Nichols as Jack, Miranda Richardson as Judy, and David de Keyser as Howard.

The North American premiere of The Designated Mourner was staged in March 1997 at Steppenwolf Theatre in Chicago, directed by Les Waters, and featuring David Shapiro as Jack, Martha Lavey as Judy and Nicholas Rudall as Howard.  Andre Gregory subsequently directed a stage production in New York City in 2000, and a radio play, both of which featured Wallace Shawn as Jack, Deborah Eisenberg as Judy, and Larry Pine as Howard. The play was revived in 2017 at REDCAT (Roy and Edna Disney/CalArts Theater). The production was directed by André Gregory, featuring the same cast from the 2000 New York production and presented by Alex Westerman. The play was ranked the 10th greatest American play of the past 25 years in a 2018 list by The New York Times critics.

Plot synopsis
The play takes place in what seems to be the present or the near future, in an unnamed Western country that is undergoing political conflict similar to what occurred in many Latin American countries during the Cold War: a ruling oligarchy with fascist tendencies, threatened by a communist guerrilla movement based in the lower class, is imprisoning and executing anyone suspected of subversion, including writers and intellectuals who have no direct connection to the guerrillas.

One of the latter is Howard, a respected poet who wrote political essays in his youth; his daughter Judy and her husband Jack are also at risk of becoming suspects by association. Jack, an embittered English professor, is the play's chief narrator. He is generally uninterested in politics, but is somewhat sympathetic toward the government's murderous acts, for two reasons: he secretly resents Howard as a representative of "highbrow" culture, and he fears that his middle-class world would be wiped out if the rebels succeeded. As political repression worsens, Jack withdraws from his family and from reality. Howard is killed due to an arbitrary decision by the government, Judy is arrested and subsequently executed for unclear reasons, and Jack, after recovering from his nervous breakdown, is left as the sole survivor of Howard's literary circle.

There is no visible action in the play or the film; the three characters describe their memories in separate fragments of monologue (as in Samuel Beckett's Play), with brief scenes of dialogue between them.

Though the play is generally more realistic than Shawn's previous politically charged work The Fever, it focuses on the characters' emotional lives and leaves the civil war in the background. As a result, many reviewers of the play and film have been unclear as to whether the assassinated characters were killed by the government, for sympathizing with the rebels, or (as Jack fears) by the rebels, for being privileged academics. A close reading of the play suggests that the rebels (if they even exist) have not gained power and that what has occurred is a purge by one faction of the regime. Writing in Time Out New York about the conclusion to the film, Andrew Johnston (critic) stated: "The film's final scene, in which Jack has an epiphany that inverts the one experienced by Winston Smith at the end of 1984, is sublimely harrowing. Like all great political art, Mourner offers no easy answers; instead, it uses the bond between the audience and the characters to jerk us out of our apathy and remind us that it's always later than we think."

References

External links

 Radio play on WNYC 
 Roger Ebert review of the film  "To see this film (directed by David Hare while his stage production was being performed in London with the same actors) is not the best choice. The material suffers by being placed in a frame it is not suited to. It's likely that an audio book of the play or film will be released, and that would be a good way to absorb Shawn's disturbing, introspective, Prufrockian words."
 Entertainment Weekly review of the film  Grade D.
 Variety review of the 2000 New York production 
 Los Angeles Times review of the 2017 Los Angeles production 

1997 films
1997 drama films
Plays by Wallace Shawn
Films directed by David Hare
Films shot at Pinewood Studios
British drama films
1990s English-language films
1990s British films